Rhizophydium graminis is a plant pathogen infecting the roots of both monocots and dicots.

References 

Fungal plant pathogens and diseases
Wheat diseases
Chytridiomycota